Cyclic peptides are polypeptide chains which contain a circular sequence of bonds. This can be through a connection between the amino and carboxyl ends of the peptide, for example in cyclosporin; a connection between the amino end and a side chain, for example in bacitracin; the carboxyl end and a side chain, for example in colistin; or two side chains or more complicated arrangements, for example in amanitin. Many cyclic peptides have been discovered in nature and many others have been synthesized in the laboratory. Their length ranges from just two amino acid residues to hundreds. In nature they are frequently antimicrobial or toxic; in medicine they have various applications, for example as antibiotics and immunosuppressive agents.
Thin-Layer Chromatography (TLC) is a convenient method to detect cyclic peptides in crude extract from bio-mass.

Classification
Cyclic peptides can be classified according to the types of bonds that comprise the ring.
Homodetic cyclic peptides, such as cyclosporine A, are those in which the ring is composed exclusively of normal peptide bonds (i.e. between the alpha carboxyl of one residue to the alpha amine of another).  The smallest such species are 2,5-diketopiperazines, being derived from the cyclisation of a dipeptide.
Cyclic isopeptides contain at least one non-alpha amide linkage, such as a linkage between the side chain of one residue to the alpha carboxyl group of another residue, as in microcystin and bacitracin. 
Cyclic depsipeptides, such as aureobasidin A and HUN-7293, have at least one lactone (ester) linkage in place of one of the amides. Some cyclic depsipeptides are cyclized between the C-terminal carboxyl and the side chain of a Thr or Ser residue in the chain, such as kahalalide F, theonellapeptolide, and didemnin B. 
 Bicyclics such as the amanitins and the phalloidins contain a bridging group, generally between two of the side chains.  In the amatoxins, this is formed as a sulfoxide bridge between the Trp and Cys residues. Other bicyclic peptides include echinomycin, triostin A, and Celogentin C.
 There are a number of bi and monocyclic peptides which are cyclized through a disulfide bond between two cysteines, oxytocin being a notable example.

Biosynthesis
Cyclic peptides in plants are synthesized via a two-step process; the translation of a linear peptide chain, and its subsequent formation into a cyclic structure through activities of a protease-like enzyme or other ways.

Properties and applications
Cyclic peptides tend to be extremely resistant to the process of digestion, making them of interest to scientists working on novel oral medications.

Examples include:
 
 Amanitins
 Bacitracin
 Colistin
 Ciclosporin
 Dactinomycin
 Daptomycin
 Gramicidin S
 Hymenistatin
 Microcystins
 Nisin
 Nodularin
 Octreotide
 Polymyxin B
 Pristinamycin
 Valinomycin (technically a depsipeptide)
 Vancomycin
 Viscumamide
 Yunnanin A

See also
 Nonribosomal peptide
 lantibiotics, 19-37 residues and 1 to 5 'bridges'

References

External links 
 Cybase
 

 
Peripheral membrane proteins